Maria Celia Laborde  (born 2 August 1990) is a Cuban-born American judoka. 

She won a bronze medal at the 2014 World Judo Championships in Chelyabinsk for Cuba. After won a bronze at the Paris Grand Slam in 2013, she went on to represent the United States. Laborde claimed a bronze medal at the 2022 Pan American-Oceania Championships, in Lima, Peru.

References

External links
 

1990 births
Living people
Cuban female judoka
American female judoka